Paul Michael Lotman (born November 3, 1985) is an American former professional volleyball player. He was part of the US national team, and a participant at the Olympic Games London 2012. The 2014 World League and the 2015 World Cup winner.

Personal life
Lotman was born in Lakewood, California. His parents are Kathleen and Albert Lotman (his father died in 2011). He has two older brothers, Mark and Steven, and an older sister Shelley. He attended Los Alamitos High School (1999–2003). He graduated from California State University, Long Beach (better known as Long Beach State) in 2008 with a degree in sociology. In August 2011 he married Jasmine. On December 20, 2016 his wife gave birth to their son Leif Albert Lotman.

Career

Clubs
In 2011 he joined the Polish club Asseco Resovia Rzeszów. With the club from Rzeszów he won three titles of Polish Champion (2012, 2013, 2015), Polish SuperCup and the silver medal of CEV Cup 2012. On March 29, 2015 Asseco Resovia Rzeszów, including Lotman, achieved silver medal of the 2014–15 CEV Champions League. He left Asseco Resovia in May 2015. In June 2015 he moved to German team Berlin Recycling Volleys. In 2017 he moved to Indonesian volleyball club Jakarta BNI Taplus for 2017/2018 season.

National team
Lotman made his Olympic debut with the U.S. national team in 2012 Olympics in London.

Coaching
In 2019, Lotman began working as a volunteer assistant coach with the UC San Diego Tritons men's volleyball team.

Honours

Clubs
 CEV Champions League
  2014/2015 – with Asseco Resovia

 CEV Cup
  2011/2012 – with Asseco Resovia
  2015/2016 – with Berlin Recycling Volleys

 National championships
 2007/2008  Puerto Rican Championship, with Plataneros de Corozal
 2011/2012  Polish Championship, with Asseco Resovia
 2012/2013  Polish Championship, with Asseco Resovia
 2013/2014  Polish SuperCup, with Asseco Resovia
 2014/2015  Polish Championship, with Asseco Resovia
 2015/2016  German Cup, with Berlin Recycling Volleys
 2015/2016  German Championship, with Berlin Recycling Volleys

Individual awards
 2016: CEV Cup – Most Valuable Player

References

External links

 Player profile at TeamUSA.org 
 
 Player profile at LegaVolley.it 
 Player profile at PlusLiga.pl 
 
 
 Player profile at Volleybox.net

1985 births
Living people
People from Lakewood, California
American men's volleyball players
Olympic volleyball players of the United States
Volleyball players at the 2012 Summer Olympics
American expatriate sportspeople in Greece
Expatriate volleyball players in Greece
American expatriate sportspeople in France
Expatriate volleyball players in France
American expatriate sportspeople in Italy
Expatriate volleyball players in Italy
American expatriate sportspeople in Poland
Expatriate volleyball players in Poland
American expatriate sportspeople in Germany
Expatriate volleyball players in Germany
American expatriate sportspeople in Indonesia
Expatriate volleyball players in Indonesia
American expatriate sportspeople in India
Long Beach State Beach men's volleyball players
PAOK V.C. players
Blu Volley Verona players
Resovia (volleyball) players